Cudlipptown or Cudliptown is a small village located near the western edge of Dartmoor National Park, northeast of Tavistock, and approximately one mile northeast of Peter Tavy.

The village comprises a few houses, with a post box embedded in the front garden wall of one of the houses. An inn named "the Peter Tavy Inn" is found in the village of Peter Tavy nearby.

External links

Villages in Devon